The Saint Cross Church is a church in Jingliao Village, Houbi District, Tainan, Taiwan.

History
The church was designed in the 1950s. In 1955, German priest Eric Jansen who was stationed in the village decided to build a Catholic church.

Architecture
Designed by German architect Gottfried Boehm, the church building consists of four parts, which are pyramid chapel, coned bell tower, basilica and holy shrine. Towers of the four parts were built with aluminum-covered cypress. At each of the tower tip lies a representative totem. The church features a dormitory and a kindergarten within the same compound. The church has also a small museum depicting the history of the church from its founding.

See also
 List of tourist attractions in Taiwan
 Christianity in Taiwan

References

1955 establishments in Taiwan
Roman Catholic churches completed in 1955
Churches in Tainan
Roman Catholic churches in Taiwan
20th-century Roman Catholic church buildings